Bayam Ariyaan is a 2010 Tamil-language action drama film directed by Prathesh. The film stars newcomer Mahesh Raja and Udhayathara, with Kishore, Manikandan, Saranya Ponvannan, Ponnambalam, Devi Kiruba, Aswathy, Kadhal Sukumar, and Kottachi playing supporting roles. It was released on 23 April 2010.

Plot

Police Inspector Mithran (Kishore) makes money on the side by hiring jobless youngsters in the area. The jobless Vinoth (Mahesh Raja), also known as Koni, along with his friends, indulges in criminal activities like extortion and rowdyism to fill the pocket of the corrupt cop Mithran. Despite his penchant for money, Mithran has a soft side: he cherishes his wife Ramya (Devi Kiruba) more than anything. Regarding Vinoth, he enjoys drinking and spending time in brothels. He is cruel even to his mother Saraswathi (Saranya Ponvannan), whom he beats up, ill-treats, cheats, and robs. Vinoth then falls under the spell of the college student Nivedha (Udhayathara). He woos her in an unusual fashion, and surprisingly, Nivedha slowly falls for him too. The youngster Pazham (Manikandan) is also part of Mithran's team. He hates Vinoth and can do anything for money.

Mithran then played a double game: he assigned Vinoth with the task of killing the local don Bobby (Ponnambalam). However, Mithran himself warns Bobby about it. Bobby tries to stab Vinoth from behind, but Vinoth shoots Bobby dead. One day, during a fight with other goons, Vinoth throws a glass bottle towards his offender, but it lands on his mother Saraswathi. The bottle cuts her throat, and she dies on the spot. Distraught by the loss of his mother, Vinoth feels remorseful and finally understands the value of his mother. Mithran assigned Pazham to kill the police commissioner, but he botched the mission, and Mithran gives refuge to Pazham in his home. Pazham, who was sexually aroused by Ramya, brutally rapes her and escapes from the place. A vengeful Mithran tracks Pazham down and kills him.

The police are ordered to encounter all the rowdies in the area, including Vinoth, and they shot all the rowdies. Mithran decides to kill Vinoth, but Vinoth murders him after a lengthy fight.

Cast

Mahesh Raja as Vinoth
Udhayathara as Nivedha
Kishore as Mithran
Manikandan as Pazham
Saranya Ponvannan as Saraswathi
Ponnambalam as Bobby
Devi Krupa as Ramya
Aswathy as Amudha
Kadhal Sukumar as Decent
Kottachi as Narambu
Manimaran as Kodakku
Nanjil Vijayan as Pavadai
Jayamurali
Boys Rajan
Kannan
Suriya
Master Narain
Preethi
Nagalakshmi
Shailu
Rithi Mangal

Production

Director Prathesh, erstwhile assistant to Kalanjiyam, Majith, and Kalaipuli G. Sekaran, made his directorial debut with Bayam Ariyaan under the banner Jeyamathey Pictures. Newcomer Mahesh Raja, formerly a production executive, was selected to play the hero, while Kishore and Boys''' fame Manikandan signed to play significant roles. Shanuja was initially chosen to play the female lead but owing the difference of opinion between her and the production unit, she has been replaced by Udhayathara. The film was filmed in a cemetery in Pondicherry where the entire crew dwelled and filmed continuously.

Soundtrack

The film score and the soundtrack were composed by P. C. Shivan. The soundtrack features 7 tracks with lyrics written by Mohanrajan. The audio was released on 3 December 2009 at the film chamber in Chennai by director Venkat Prabhu and Sneha. James Vasanthan, Jai, Vaibhav Reddy, and R. K. attended the function.

Release
The film was released on 23 April 2010 alongside Pattu Vanna Rosavam and Rettaisuzhi.

Critical receptionSify said, "The hero Mahesh remains wooden mostly through the film and the blue eye color looks bizarre, to say the least. Udayathara does what is required. Kishore seems wasted in this role. The film has skimmed over several issues and there is nothing really gripping to make you sit through". Pavithra Srinivasan of Rediff.com'' rated the film 1.5 out of 5 and stated, "Bayam Ariyaan could have been a watchable film if the director had come up with an engaging, logical screenplay, instead of just playing to the front-benchers. The end product is amateurish". A reviewer wrote, "Better avoid this film or else you’ll get indulged in criminal activities by breaking down the theatres or even torn the screens" and called it "Below Average".

Box office
The film took a below average opening at the Chennai box office.

References

2010 films
2010s Tamil-language films
2010 action drama films
Indian action drama films
Indian gangster films
Films shot in Puducherry
2010 directorial debut films